In mathematics, linear interpolation is a method of curve fitting using linear polynomials to construct new data points within the range of a discrete set of known data points.

Linear interpolation between two known points

For a value  in the interval , the value  along the straight line is given from the equation of slopes 

which can be derived geometrically from the figure on the right.

which is the formula for linear interpolation in the interval . Outside this interval, the formula is identical to linear extrapolation.

This formula can also be understood as a weighted average. The weights are inversely related to the distance from the end points to the unknown point; the closer point has more influence than the farther point. Because these sum to 1, 

yielding the formula for linear interpolation given above.

Interpolation of a data set
 
Linear interpolation on a set of data points  is defined as the concatenation of linear interpolants between each pair of data points. This results in a continuous curve, with a discontinuous derivative (in general), thus of differentiability class

Linear interpolation as approximation

Linear interpolation is often used to approximate a value of some function  using two known values of that function at other points. The error of this approximation is defined as

where  denotes the linear interpolation polynomial defined above:

It can be proven using Rolle's theorem that if  has a continuous second derivative, then the error is bounded by

That is, the approximation between two points on a given function gets worse with the second derivative of the function that is approximated. This is intuitively correct as well: the "curvier" the function is, the worse the approximations made with simple linear interpolation become.

History and applications
Linear interpolation has been used since antiquity for filling the gaps in tables. Suppose that one has a table listing the population of some country in 1970, 1980, 1990 and 2000, and that one wanted to estimate the population in 1994. Linear interpolation is an easy way to do this. It is believed that it was used in the Seleucid Empire (last three centuries BC) and by the Greek astronomer and mathematician Hipparchus (second century BC). A description of linear interpolation can be found in the ancient Chinese mathematical text called The Nine Chapters on the Mathematical Art (九章算術), dated from 200 BC to AD 100 and the Almagest (2nd century AD) by Ptolemy.

The basic operation of linear interpolation between two values is commonly used in computer graphics. In that field's jargon it is sometimes called a lerp (from linear interpolation). The term can be used as a verb or noun for the operation. e.g. "Bresenham's algorithm lerps incrementally between the two endpoints of the line."

Lerp operations are built into the hardware of all modern computer graphics processors. They are often used as building blocks for more complex operations: for example, a bilinear interpolation can be accomplished in three lerps. Because this operation is cheap, it's also a good way to implement accurate lookup tables with quick lookup for smooth functions without having too many table entries.

Extensions

Accuracy

Multivariate

Linear interpolation as described here is for data points in one spatial dimension. For two spatial dimensions, the extension of linear interpolation is called bilinear interpolation, and in three dimensions, trilinear interpolation. Notice, though, that these interpolants are no longer linear functions of the spatial coordinates, rather products of linear functions; this is illustrated by the clearly non-linear example of bilinear interpolation in the figure below. Other extensions of linear interpolation can be applied to other kinds of mesh such as triangular and tetrahedral meshes, including Bézier surfaces. These may be defined as indeed higher-dimensional piecewise linear function (see second figure below).

Programming language support
Many libraries and shading languages have a "lerp" helper-function (in GLSL known instead as mix), returning an interpolation between two inputs (v0, v1) for a parameter (t) in the closed unit interval [0, 1]. Signatures between lerp functions are variously implemented in both the forms (v0, v1, t) and (t, v0, v1).
// Imprecise method, which does not guarantee v = v1 when t = 1, due to floating-point arithmetic error.
// This method is monotonic. This form may be used when the hardware has a native fused multiply-add instruction.
float lerp(float v0, float v1, float t) {
  return v0 + t * (v1 - v0);
}

// Precise method, which guarantees v = v1 when t = 1. This method is monotonic only when v0 * v1 < 0.
// Lerping between same values might not produce the same value
float lerp(float v0, float v1, float t) {
  return (1 - t) * v0 + t * v1;
}
This lerp function is commonly used for alpha blending (the parameter "t" is the "alpha value"), and the formula may be extended to blend multiple components of a vector (such as spatial x, y, z axes or r, g, b colour components) in parallel.

See also
 Bilinear interpolation
 Spline interpolation
 Polynomial interpolation
 de Casteljau's algorithm
 First-order hold
 Bézier curve

References

 .

External links

 Equations of the Straight Line at cut-the-knot
 Well-behaved interpolation for numbers and pointers
 
 

Interpolation

de:Interpolation (Mathematik)#Lineare Interpolation